The Lion King: The Gift (frequently referred to as simply The Gift) is a soundtrack album created by American singer Beyoncé for the 2019 photorealistic animated remake of The Lion King and for Black Is King (2020). It was released on July 19, 2019, by Parkwood Entertainment and Columbia Records. The album was also produced by Beyoncé and features African artists such as Wizkid, Shatta Wale, Burna Boy, Mr Eazi, Tiwa Savage, Tekno, Yemi Alade, Busiswa, Moonchild Sanelly and Salatiel, as well as appearances from Jay-Z, Blue Ivy Carter, Childish Gambino, Pharrell Williams, Kendrick Lamar, Tierra Whack, 070 Shake, and Jessie Reyez, among others.

Background and release 

On July 9, 2019, it was revealed that Beyoncé produced and curated an album titled The Lion King: The Gift, which features new songs inspired by the film, as well as "Spirit" from the soundtrack.

Beyoncé called the album "sonic cinema" and said that the film "is a new experience of storytelling", and that the album "is influenced by everything from R&B, pop, hip hop and Afro beat". Beyoncé also said that "[she] wanted to put everyone on their own journey to link the storyline" and that the songs were inspired by the remake's storyline, which "gives the listener a chance to imagine their own imagery, while listening to a new contemporary interpretation". The songs were also produced by African producers, which Beyoncé said was because "authenticity and heart were important to [her]", since the film is set in Africa.

The tracklist was revealed through Beyoncé's official website on July 16, 2019.

On September 16, 2019, Beyoncé released a behind-the-scenes TV special, titled Beyoncé Presents: Making the Gift, documenting the album's creation and her journey through Africa, shot in Egypt, Nigeria, South Africa, and United States. The documentary was aired on ABC. It was written, directed and produced by Beyoncé alongside co-director Ed Burke, with executive producers Steve Pamon and Erinn Williams.

Critical reception 

At Metacritic, which assigns a normalized rating out of 100 to reviews from mainstream publications, the album received a weighted average score of 77, based on 13 reviews, indicating "generally favorable reviews".

Writing for AllMusic, Neil Z. Yeung describes the album as "a buoyant hybrid of futuristic, cross-Atlantic Afro-pop", adding that the "expertly curated collection is an artistic showcase celebrating Africa and black musical traditions, elevating the movie experience with strategic thematic interludes that could help this album endure far longer than the film." The Lion King: The Gift was chosen as The New York Times's Critic's Pick, with Jon Pareles writing that "Beyoncé flexes both her musicianship and her cultural leverage... It's her latest lesson in commandeering mass-market expectations, as she bends The Lion King to her own agenda of African-diaspora unity, self-worth, parental responsibility and righteous ambition." A.D. Amorosi for Variety praises the album as "a wild, wonderful offering dedicated to sounds and soul of the motherland", calling it an "offering to the idea of bringing connection to those who never realized such was possible, maintaining heritage in the face of aborted and abbreviated histories".

Describing it as an album "that ably displays [Beyoncé's] excellent taste, rather than a great Beyoncé album per se," Alexis Petridis of The Guardian writes that The Lion King: The Gift gives "the dominant Afrobeats sound a vast new level of exposure – an impressive feat in itself". "Beyoncé's Lion King album is the event the movie wishes it could be," writes Carl Wilson of Slate, arguing that The Gift "works best if you forget the remake even exists" and encouraging listeners to "take it more as a (mildly) new perspective on Beyoncé" since thematically the album "transliterates the leonine royal-family drama and 'circle of life' worldview of [the movie] into the recent main leitmotif of Beyoncé's own work." "An ambitious companion album that says more than the movie does about family and tradition and responsibility and Africa", writes Mikael Wood of Los Angeles Times. "No one takes possession of a cultural space like Beyoncé. We saw it happen in 2016 when she easily outshone Coldplay during its own Super Bowl halftime performance. We saw it happen last year when she remade the world's most prestigious music festival as Beychella. Now we’re seeing it again with Disney's new version of The Lion King".

Michelle Kim for Pitchfork opines that the album "succeeds in introducing a whole new musical universe to the average American listener". Writing for The Telegraph, Neil McCormick says, "The Gift is a quixotic compilation of tracks", calling the album a "tipping point" for African artists worldwide. Bernadette Giacomazzo of HipHopDX also praised the album, saying that the album "trips the black fantastic" and that many songs were capable of standing independent of the film. Drawing comparisons to the Black Panther soundtrack "down to the Kendrick Lamar appearance," Giacomazzo says that the album is "one of the first Beyoncé albums—such as it were—in which Mrs.Carter's creativity serves as a vector to another creative vision, rather than as the creative vision itself. Overall, it works and is another jewel in her crown — one that she, overall, can be proud to call hers".

Accolades 
At the 2019 Soul Train Music Awards, "Spirit" was nominated for Best Video of the Year and Best Dance Performance, while "Brown Skin Girl" was nominated for Best Collaboration and The Ashford & Simpson Songwriter's Award, winning the latter. The Lion King: The Gift was nominated for Best Pop Vocal Album at the 62nd Annual Grammy Awards while "Spirit" received two nominations: for Best Pop Solo Performance and Best Song Written for Visual Media. "Brown Skin Girl" went on to Best Music Video at the 63rd Annual Grammy Awards.

Vibe included The Gift on their list of the 30 best albums of 2019, while The Fader also included the release on their selections of the best albums of the same year. Both City Pages and Fuse included The Gift on their lists of the best albums of 2019, while Brooklyn Vegan listed the soundtrack at number 22 on their ranking of the best rap and R&B albums of the same year. In December 2020, PopMatters named The Lion King: The Gift (Deluxe Edition) the 9th best pop album of 2020.

Commercial performance 
The Lion King: The Gift debuted at number two on the US Billboard 200 with 54,000 album-equivalent units, of which 11,000 were pure album sales.

It became Beyoncé's second top 10 debut of 2019 (following Homecoming: The Live Album) and third top 10 album of 2019 (after Lemonade re-entered the Billboard 200 chart following its wide streaming release). It is also the ninth top 10 album of Beyoncé's solo career.

On the Billboard genre charts, The Lion King: The Gift debuted at number one on several charts including Top R&B Albums, Top R&B/Hip-Hop Albums, Top Soundtrack Albums and Top World Albums. It became Beyoncé's seventh number one on the Top R&B/Hip-Hop Albums chart as a solo artist.

Following the release of Black Is King in July 2020, the album re-entered the Billboard 200 at number ten.

Impact 
African musicians and producers who worked on The Lion King: The Gift, amongst others, have spoken about the impact they predict the album will have on African music in the United States. Ghanaian producer GuiltyBeatz said "Now that Beyoncé released a whole album [of African music], this will open the gateway" for those sounds to enter the American market; Nigerian singer Yemi Alade added that the album will be "another awakening". Nigerian producer P2J described how the album is "going to change the face of music", adding that "Brown Skin Girl" is "one of the first songs in my career that I thought was going to be very special... It's a big moment for Africa." South African artist DJ Lag said that the album has "opened doors" for him and that the sound of The Lion King: The Gift is "going to be the next big thing." Bloomberg's Anthony Osae-Brown stated that with The Lion King: The Gift, Beyoncé is taking the "Nigeria music scene global". Director of Urban Music at YouTube Tuma Basa called the release of The Lion King: The Gift "a tipping-point moment", while Nigerian producer E-Kelly said that it "is gonna create a new awareness" and "open a big crack" for Afrobeats to enter American mainstream music.

The track "Brown Skin Girl" inspired a viral trend called "#brownskingirlchallenge", where black women and girls post pictures and videos of themselves in celebration of their skin, as well as people encouraging their young family members to be proud of their skin. Celebrities including Ava DuVernay, Barbara Lee, Gabrielle Union and Lupita Nyong'o participated in the trend. Several thinkpieces and articles were also produced in response to "Brown Skin Girl".

Beyoncé Presents: Making The Gift 
On September 15, 2019, it was announced a documentary chronicling the development, production and filming of The Lion King: The Gift, entitled Beyoncé Presents: Making The Gift, would air on ABC September 16. A trailer was released the same day to promote the documentary. Airing nearly two months after the release of the album, Beyoncé Presents: Making The Gift was met with a viewership of 2.49 million and "dominated" that night's ratings.

Black Is King 

A musical film and visual album based on the music of The Gift was released on July 31, 2020 on Disney+. The film – directed, written, and executive produced by Beyoncé – tells the story of a young African prince who is exiled from his kingdom after the death of his father. As he grows up into a man, the prince undergoes a journey of self-identity, using the guidance of his ancestor, childhood love and his own subconscious to reclaim his throne. The prince's journey acts as an allegory for the African diaspora's journey of discovering, reclaiming and celebrating their culture and heritage, which is echoed by the inclusion of spoken-word poetry in the film that focuses on the question of black identity.

Black Is King was in production for over a year and was filmed across three continents. Beyoncé wanted to recruit a diverse cast and crew and to provide opportunities for new talent. The film's music, dances, costumes, hairstyles and sets were designed to showcase the beauty and richness of the cultures in the African continent and diaspora.

The film received universal acclaim from critics, with praise for Beyoncé's direction, the cinematography, score, costume design, subject matter, and cultural themes. At the 63rd Annual Grammy Awards, Black Is King was nominated for Best Music Film, while the "Brown Skin Girl" video was nominated for Best Music Video.

Deluxe edition 
On July 31, 2020, alongside the release of Black Is King, Beyoncé released a deluxe edition of the album. The album includes all the tracks included in the film in addition to three new tracks. This includes the standard and extended versions of "Black Parade", which was released on June 19; the extended version of the song was only available on Tidal up until the album's release. The other track included is a remix of "Find Your Way Back" by MeLo-X.

Track listing 
Credits adapted from Beyoncé's website. All tracks were produced by Beyoncé and Derek Dixie, except where noted.

Notes
  signifies a co-producer
  signifies an additional producer
  signifies an uncredited additional producer
  signifies a producer credited on the extended version of the song
 All song titles are stylized in all caps
 All interlude titles are stylized in all lowercase
 "Bigger" features vocals by Raye
 "Spirit" features background vocals by Labrinth, Ilya, Jamal Moore, Maurice Smith, J Rome, Derrick Charles, DeP, George Young, Vernon Burris, TJ Wilkins, Andre Washington, Mabvuto Carpenter, Jason Morales, Johnny Gilmore, Stevie Notes, Marcus Eldridge, Edward Lawson, and Steve Epting

Sample credits 
 "Find Your Way Back" contains elements of "Maradona", written by Sarz and performed by Niniola.
 "Mood 4 Eva" contains elements of "Diaraby Nene" written and performed by Oumou Sangaré; contains an interpolation of "Sweet Green Fields" written by Jimmy Seals; contains an interpolation of "(Think) About It" written by James Brown.

Personnel 
Credits adapted from Beyoncé's official website.

Musicians 
 Beyoncé – vocals
 String section 
 Adrienne Woods, Bianca McClure, Chelsea Stevens, Crystal Alforque, Jonathan Richards, Marta Honer, Rhea Hosanny, Stephanie Matthews, Stephanie Yu, Tahirah Whittington
 Pino Palladino – bass 
 Courtney Leonard – bass 
 Rod Castro – guitar 
 Ari PenSmith – keyboards 
 Derek Dixie – drums 
 Ilya – drums, keyboards, percussion 
 Labrinth – drums, keyboards, percussion 
 Jeremy Lertola – percussion 
 Jeff Lorber – piano 
 David Fleming – strings

Production 
 Beyoncé – executive producer
 Kwasi Fordjour – creative director
 Derek Dixie – music director
 Big Jon Platt – A&R executive
 Teresa LaBarbera Whites – A&R executive
 Steven "Steve-O" Carless – A&R executive

Charts

Weekly charts

Year-end charts

Release history

References 

2019 soundtrack albums
Beyoncé albums
Albums produced by Beyoncé
Albums produced by DJ Khaled
Albums produced by Diplo
Albums produced by Ilya Salmanzadeh
Albums produced by Labrinth
Albums produced by Sounwave
Albums produced by GuiltyBeatz
Columbia Records albums
The Lion King (franchise)
Albums produced by Michael Uzowuru